The following lists events that happened in 1975 in Iceland.

Incumbents
President – Kristján Eldjárn
Prime Minister – Geir Hallgrímsson

Events
24 October – Women's Strike

Births

12 March – Sigmundur Davíð Gunnlaugsson, politician.
23 April – Jónsi, guitarist and vocalist
7 May – Árni Gautur Arason, footballer
15 may – Ólafur Örn Bjarnason, footballer
10 July – Stefán Karl Stefánsson, actor (d. 2018)
10 September – Barði Jóhannsson, musician, writer, TV show host, film director and clothing designer
16 October – Brynjar Gunnarsson, footballer

Full date missing
Heimir Björgúlfsson, artist

Deaths

22 August – Guðrún frá Lundi, poet and novelist (b. 1887)
21 November – Gunnar Gunnarsson, writer (b. 1889)

References

 
1970s in Iceland
Iceland
Iceland
Years of the 20th century in Iceland